Brawley Guitars is an American guitar manufacturing brand. The founder, Keith Brawley, has worked in the guitar industry as product designer and marketing executive, having also been an executive for Fender/Squier from 1989–2001. The company is headquartered in Temecula, California. Brawley currently produces electric guitars and basses.

History 
The guitars were produced in South Korea between 2000 and 2002. All featured a solid body with a contour top, bolt-on neck, self-locking winders and a wider 'fat fret' neck. Though available in several configurations, including double humbucker models, typical models featured 2 single coil Custom Alnico pickups and one bridge mounted humbucker with either Wilkinson and Floyd Rose vibrato bars. A twin humbucker hardtail model was also made. The fit, finish, and feature of Brawley's fretted instruments represented a very strong value-for-money at the time. Keith Brawley likened his guitars to Lexus cars in press interviews.

Brawley also produced a range of bass guitars in four-string, five-string and six-string versions. The top-of-the-line models featured neck-through body construction and all of them had a 35-inch scale length, as opposed to the standard 34-inch scale developed by Leo Fender on the first electric basses. These were known as the Artemis series and featured humbucking pickups on all models and active electronics on all but the entry-level model.

Mars music stores was a large dealer of Brawley guitars, but the music store chain failed amidst overheated expansion, taking down Brawley guitars with it. Keith Brawley subsequently worked for Guitar Center where, after five years as the vice president of guitar merchandising, he was promoted to the position of vice president of merchandising and creative at the company's direct-response division, Musician's Friend. There, he oversaw both the purchasing and creative teams producing the company's catalog and Internet efforts.

Keith sold his guitar designs to Guitar Center to be used as the Laguna brand, currently sold as an in-store brand. The Laguna guitars are modeled after Keith's designs, right down to the headstock, although the production of Laguna is in Indonesia, rather than South Korea. Later, Brawley was appointed as Chief Business Development Officer for Taylor Guitars.

Some Southern California stores such as Jim’s Music in Irvine, California Johnny Thompson Music in Monterey Park and Instrumental Music in Thousand Oaks, California showed great success with Brawley instruments, including Costa Mesa's "Cobra Music". There are many bands that can be seen using Brawley Guitars including Charles Jirkovsky of San Diego band "All in Favor" and Brian Sun of "Residual FX."

References

External links
 Official website (archived, 20 Jul 2019)
 Laguna guitars (with Brawley's designs) on Guitar Center
 Reviews of Brawley guitars
 Article detailing modifications to a Brawley A-122
 Follow-up article detailing modifications to a Brawley A-122
 Brawley guitar models and their specifications

Electric guitars
American brands
2000 establishments in the United States